Dall River Old Growth Provincial Park is a provincial park in British Columbia, Canada. It is part of the larger Muskwa-Kechika Management Area and is located immediately northwest of Denetiah Provincial Park, northwest of the junction of the Gataga and Kechika Rivers.  Established in 1999, the park is 642 ha. in area.  The park protects areas of white spruce old growth.

References

Provincial parks of British Columbia
Liard Country
Cassiar Mountains
1999 establishments in British Columbia
Protected areas established in 1999